Isa Аskhabovich Chaniev (born 2 November 1992, in Sunzhensky, Ingushetia) is a Russian professional boxer who competes in the lightweight division. He has held the IBF Inter-Continental and WBO International titles since 2017.

Professional career
Isa Chaniev made his professional debut in 2015 at the age of 22. He won the IBF Youth super featherweight title in 2016, and amassed a record of 10 wins with half of them by stoppage.

On 25 May 2017, Chaniev faced Fedor Papazov for the latter's IBO and vacant IBF Inter-Continental lightweight titles in Riga, Latvia. The competitive fight resulted in a "razor-thin" unanimous decision win for Papazov. The scorecards were 115–114, 115-113 and 116–113. Chaniev's team protested the decision in addition to, what manager Khusein Buzurtanov described as, "the attempt to falsify the results of doping-control by the team of Papazov." On 9 July, it was reported the IBF had withdrawn its recognition of the title fight due to irregularities by Papazov's team during the post-fight drug testing.

Chaniev next faced Belgian veteran Jean-Pierre Bauwens for the vacant IBF Inter-Continental title on 26 August in Vilnius, Lithuania. He dominated Bauwens throughout the fight and won the bout by unanimous decision.

On 9 December, Chaniev defeated Filipino lightweight Juan Martin Elorde, grandson of Gabriel "Flash" Elorde, to claim the vacant WBO International title in Nazran, Ingushetia. Chaniev dominated Elorde throughout the fight before winning by technical knockout in the sixth round to successfully defend his IBF Inter-Continental title.

In April 2018, it was announced that Chaniev would defend his titles against Venezuelan veteran Ismael Barroso on 12 May in Riga, Latvia. He won the fight by unanimous decision.

Professional boxing record

References

External links

1992 births
Living people
Lightweight boxers
Russian male boxers
Russian people of Ingush descent
People from Nazran